Don Coppersmith (born  1950) is a cryptographer and mathematician. He was involved in the design of the Data Encryption Standard block cipher at IBM, particularly the design of the S-boxes, strengthening them against differential cryptanalysis.
He also improved the quantum Fourier transform discovered by Peter Shor in the same year (1994). He has also worked on algorithms for computing discrete logarithms, the cryptanalysis of RSA, methods for rapid matrix multiplication (see Coppersmith–Winograd algorithm) and IBM's MARS cipher. Don is also a co-designer of the SEAL and Scream ciphers.

In 1972, Coppersmith obtained a bachelor's degree in mathematics at the Massachusetts Institute of Technology, and a Masters and Ph.D. in mathematics from Harvard University in 1975 and 1977 respectively. He was a Putnam Fellow each year from 1968–1971, becoming the first four-time Putnam Fellow in history. In 1998, he started Ponder This, an online monthly column on mathematical puzzles and problems. In October 2005, the column was taken over by James Shearer.  Around that same time, he left IBM and began working at the IDA Center for Communications Research, Princeton.

In 2002, Coppersmith won the RSA Award for Excellence in Mathematics.

See also 
 Coppersmith's attack
 Coppersmith method

References

External links
 

20th-century American mathematicians
21st-century American mathematicians
IBM employees
IBM Research computer scientists
Harvard Graduate School of Arts and Sciences alumni
Modern cryptographers
Putnam Fellows
1950s births
Living people
Massachusetts Institute of Technology School of Science alumni
International Association for Cryptologic Research fellows